Zakharyino is a rural locality (a village) in Staroselskoye Rural Settlement, Vologodsky District, Vologda Oblast, Russia. The population was 13 as of 2002.

Geography 
Zakharyino is located 70 km northwest of Vologda (the district's administrative centre) by road. Yesyukovo is the nearest rural locality.

References 

Rural localities in Vologodsky District